Cameroon national under-23 football team, also known as the Indomitable Lions (Les Lions Indomptables), represents Cameroon in international football competitions in Olympic Games. The selection is limited to players under the age of 23, except during the Olympic Games where the use of three overage players is allowed. The team is controlled by the Cameroonian Football Federation.

Recent results and fixtures

2019

Players

Current squad
 The following players were called up for the 2023 Africa U-23 Cup of Nations qualification matches.
 Match dates: 22 and 30 October 2022
 Opposition: 
Caps and goals correct as of: 12 August 2022, after the match against

Overage players in Olympic Games

Honours
Summer Olympic Games
Gold Medal: 2000
African Games
Gold Medal: 1991, 1999, 2003, 2007
Bronze Medal: 2011

Footnotes

References

External links
Fédération Camerounaise de Football official site

Under
African national under-23 association football teams